Agama (from Sranan Tongo meaning "lizard") is a genus of small-to-moderate-sized, long-tailed, insectivorous Old World lizards. The genus Agama includes at least 37  species in Africa, especially sub-Saharan Africa, where most regions are home to at least one species. Eurasian agamids are largely assigned to genus Laudakia.

Their colour also differs between species, between genders, and according to mood; for example, a dominant male in display mode is far brighter than when it has been caught, beaten by another male, or otherwise alarmed. Females tend to be less colourful than the males of the species. 

According to species, agamas live in forest, in bush, among rocks and on crags, but where their habitat has been cleared, or simply occupied by humans, some species also adapt to life in villages and compounds, for example inside the thatch of huts and other sheltering crevices. Agamids' hind legs generally are long and powerful; and the lizards can run and leap swiftly when alarmed.

Agamas are diurnal, active during the day. They can tolerate higher temperatures than most reptiles, but when temperatures approach 38 °C (100 °F) they generally shelter in the shade. Males frequently threaten each other by nodding, weaving, and displaying their brightest colours to establish dominance. If that is insufficient, they lash their tails and threaten each other with open jaws. The jaws are very powerful, and older males commonly have damaged tails as souvenirs of past combat. Females may sometimes chase and fight one another, and hatchlings mimic the adults' behaviour.

Agamas are mainly insectivorous, hunting prey by sight and snatching it opportunistically. Their incisor-like front teeth and powerful jaws are adapted to dealing with quite large, hard prey. They also may eat eggs of other lizards, and sometimes feed on vegetable matter, such as suitable grass, berries, and seeds.

Though not formally polygamous, dominant males commonly accommodate several females at a time in their territory. During courtship, and also when asserting his territory, the male bobs his head in display; this gives rise to some of the common names, such as Afrikaans koggelmander (literally, "little mocking man"). Females occasionally initiate courtship by offering their hindquarters to the male and provoking him to catch her. Typically the breeding season is timed for eggs to be laid during the season after the rains. Eggs are laid in clutches of up to 12, depending on species and the size of the female.

Etymology and taxonomy
In the 10th edition of Systema Naturae of 1758,  Linnaeus used the name Agama (pg. 288) as the species Lacerta Agama (with Agama originally capitalized to indicate a name in apposition rather than a Latin adjective, which he would have made lowercase). His own earlier description from 1749  was derived from Seba,  who described and illustrated a number of lizards as Salamandra amphibia and Salamandra Americana, said to resemble in some ways a chameleon lizard and that supposedly came (in error) from "America." Seba did not use the term "agama", however. Linnaeus repeated Seba's error in stating that the lizards lived in the Americas ["habitat in America"], and he included other types of lizards shown and mentioned by Seba under his species name Agama.  

Daudin  later created the new genus, Agama, to incorporate various African and Asian lizards, as well as species from Mexico, the Caribbean, Central America, and South America. He noted that the name agama was used by inhabitants of Guiana for a species that he included in the genus Agama.

The word "agama"  has been traced to West African Gbe languages as a name for the chameleon. The word was brought to Dutch Guiana (modern Suriname) by imported West African slaves and was then used in local creole languages for types of local lizards. Linnaeus may have taken the name "agama" from some unidentified source in the mistaken belief that the reptiles came from the Americas as indicated by Seba.

The name "agama" has no connection to either Greek agamos "unmarried" (as a supposed Latin feminine agama) or to Greek agamai "wonder" as sometimes suggested.

Because of the confusion over the actual taxon that was the basis for the name Agama agama, Wagner, et al. (2009)  designated a neotype (ZFMK 15222), using a previously described specimen from Cameroon in the collection of the Zoologisches Forschungsmuseum Alexander Koenig in Bonn.

Species
Listed alphabetically.

Nota bene: A binomial authority in parentheses indicates that the species was originally described in a genus other than Agama.

References

Further reading
Manthey, Ulrich; Schuster, Norbert (1996). Agamid Lizards. U.S.A.: T.F.H Publications Inc. 189 pp. .
Spawls, Stephen; Howell, Kim M.; Drewes, Robert C. (2006). Reptiles and Amphibians of East Africa. Princeton, New Jersey: Princeton University Press. .

External links

 Information on Agamids in captivity
 

 
Agamid lizards of Africa
Lizard genera
Taxa named by François Marie Daudin